Ryan Camilleri (born 22 May 1988) is a Maltese international footballer who plays for Valletta as a right back.

Career
Born in Pietà, Camilleri has played club football for Pietà Hotspurs , Hibernians and Valletta.

He made his international debut for Malta in 2012.

References

1988 births
Living people
Maltese footballers
Malta international footballers
Maltese Premier League players
Pietà Hotspurs F.C. players
Hibernians F.C. players
Valletta F.C. players
People from Pietà, Malta
Association football fullbacks